Warren S. Brown (born September 8, 1944) is director of the Travis Research Institute  and professor of psychology in the Graduate School of Psychology at Fuller Theological Seminary.  Brown received his doctorate in Experimental Physiological Psychology from the University of Southern California (1971).  Prior to Fuller, Brown spent 11 years as a research scientist at the UCLA Brain Research Institute.  He was a founding member of the National Organization for Disorders of the Corpus Callosum, the International Research Consortium on the Corpus Callosum and Cerebral Connectivity (IRC5), and the International Society for Science and Religion. Brown and his wife founded the annual "Warren and Janet Brown Scholarship" at Fuller that supports students in neuropsychological research.

Neuropsychological research
Warren Brown is involved in experimental neuropsychological research related to functions of the corpus callosum of the brain and its relationship to higher cognitive processes in humans. In particular, he has been studying the implications of agenesis of the corpus callosum (i.e., congenital absence of the corpus callosum, the pathway that connects the right and left hemispheres).  Brown has been interested in the implications of this disorder for mental abilities and social awareness. Over the last 20 years his lab has conducted one of the largest studies accomplished thus far (both in number of subjects and depth of testing) on cognitive and social disabilities of individuals with agenesis of the corpus callosum. He has authored or coauthored over 80 scholarly articles in peer-reviewed scientific journals; 15 chapters in edited scholarly books; and over 150 presentations at scientific meetings.

Selected publications

Books
Warren Brown, Nancey Murphy and H. Newton Maloney (eds.)  Whatever Happened to the Soul?  Scientific and Theological Portraits of Human Nature.  Minneapolis: Fortress Press, 1998. Won the "Outstanding Books in Theology and the Natural Sciences Prize", awarded by the Center for Theology and the Natural Sciences in 1999.
Nancey Murphy and Warren Brown. Did My Neurons Make Me Do It? :  Philosophical and Neurobiological Perspectives on Moral Responsibility and Free Will.  Oxford, U.K., Oxford University Press, 2007.
Malcolm Jeeves and Warren Brown. Neuroscience, Psychology and Religion: Illusions, Delusions, and Realities about Human Nature.  Radnor, Penn: Templeton Press, 2009.
Brown, W.S. and Strawn, B.D. The Physical Nature of Christian Life: Neuroscience, Psychology and the Church. Cambridge, UK: Cambridge University Press, 2012.

Research articles
Brown, W.S. and Paul L.K., (2000) Psychosocial deficits in agenesis of the corpus callosum with normal intelligence.  Cognitive Neuropsychiatry. 5, 135–157.
Brown, W.S., Paul, L.K., Symington, M., and Dietrich, R. (2005) Comprehension of Humor in Primary Agenesis of the Corpus Callosum. Neuropsychologia. 43: 906–916.
Brown, W.S., Symington, M., VanLancker, D., Dietrich, R. and Paul, L.K. (2005) Paralinguistic processing in children with Callosal Agenesis: Emergence of neurolinguistic deficits. Brain and Language.  93, 135–139.
Brown, W.S., Anderson, L., Symington, M.F. and Paul, L.K.(2012) Decision-Making in Agenesis of the Corpus Callosum: Expectancy-Valence in the Iowa Gambling Task. Archives of Clinical Neuropsychology. 27(5): 532–544.

Awards and honors
Awards
 C. Davis Weyerhaeuser Teaching Excellence Award by The Stewardship Foundation (1992)
 Point Loma Nazarene University Outstanding Alumnus Award (1988)
 National Science Foundation U.S.-Industrialized Countries Exchange of Scientists and Engineers (1986)
 Research Scientist Development Award, Type I by the NIMH (1975–1980)
Honors
 Fellow of Division 40 and Division 6 of the American Psychological Association

Notes

References

External links
Curriculum Vitae (PDF)
Warren S. Brown at Fuller Theological Seminary
Travis Research Institute
Human Brain and Cognition Lab 

1944 births
Fuller Theological Seminary faculty
Living people
Members of the International Society for Science and Religion
University of Southern California alumni
Writers about religion and science